Lyagayevo is a rural locality (a village) in Kochyovskoye Rural Settlement, Kochyovsky District, Perm Krai, Russia. The population was 117 as of 2010. There are 5 streets.

Geography 
Lyagayevo is located 7 km west of Kochyovo (the district's administrative centre) by road. Tarasovo is the nearest rural locality.

References 

Rural localities in Kochyovsky District